Jared Craig Shuster (born August 3, 1998) is an American professional baseball pitcher in the Atlanta Braves organization.  He played college baseball at Wake Forest University. He was drafted by the Braves in the first round (25th pick) of the 2020 Major League Baseball Draft.

Personal life
Shuster is the son of Bennett and Lori Shuster, and is Jewish. He has a sister, Alexa. His hometown is New Bedford, Massachusetts. As a child, Shuster's favorite Major League Baseball team was the Boston Red Sox.

High school
Shuster attended New Bedford High School before transferring to Tabor Academy in Marion, Massachusetts, graduating in 2017. He had a 6–0 win-loss record with an 0.45 earned run average (ERA) as a freshman at New Bedford High School, throwing in the mid-80s and touching the high-80s. Then at Tabor Academy, he was 2–1 with a 1.88 ERA as a sophomore, 3–2 with a 2.40 ERA as a junior, and 4–3 with a 1.26 ERA and 64 strikeouts in 39 innings pitched as a senior while he was captain of the team. As a junior he batted .506 with nine doubles and six home runs in 25 games, and as a senior both pitching and playing outfield he batted .347 with four home runs. He also played basketball.

College
Shuster played college baseball at Wake Forest University for the Demon Deacons. As a freshman he was 0–3 with a 7.41 ERA, and as a sophomore he was 4-4 with a 6.49 ERA while striking out 94 batters in 68 innings (12.4 K/9IP, the third-highest ratio in school history) and was twice named Atlantic Coast Conference Pitcher of the Week.  As a junior in 2020 in a season shortened by Covid he was 2–1 with a 3.76 ERA, as in four starts he struck out 43 batters (tied for third in the ACC) and walked 4 in 26.1 innings (14.7 K/9IP), and had 10.75 strikeouts per walk,  holding batters to a .221 batting average.

After the 2018 season, he played collegiate summer baseball with the New Bedford Bay Sox of the New England Collegiate Baseball League, and was 2–4 with a 2.76 ERA and a league-leading 62 strikeouts in 49 innings. After the 2019 season, Shuster played collegiate summer baseball with the Orleans Firebirds of the Cape Cod Baseball League, and was 4–0 with a 1.36 ERA with 36 strikeouts (6th in the league) and 5 walks in 33.0 innings, and was named a league All-Star.

His sinking two-seam and riding four-seam fastball was 92–94 mph and hit 97 mph, and Shuster's best pitch was his 80 mph changeup (that he throws over 10 miles per hour slower than his fastball, and which he throws in any count), which produced a 60% whiff rate. He also has an improving slider.

Professional career

Draft
The Atlanta Braves selected Shuster in the first round, with the 25th pick, of the 2020 Major League Baseball Draft. He was the seventh first-round draft pick in Wake Forest history.  He signed for a signing bonus of $2,197,500; because the 2020 season was uncertain, 2020 draft picks received a maximum of $100,000 up front, and the rest of their bonus was to be deferred over the following two years. Shuster's signing bonus was regarded as under slot, and the Braves reallocated the savings to sign Bryce Elder.

Braves vice president of scouting Dana Brown said: "We think ... there's a chance this guy could be a three-pitch mix with above-average-to-plus stuff." ESPN's Karl Ravech said: "Talk about somebody who checks a lot of the boxes, Jared Shuster is one of those. His whiff rate on his changeup, it's even as good as that guy, Luis Castillo, who has one of the best in the world." Former major leaguer Eduardo Perez said: "You have to look at the release point of where he lets it go... it's the same release point as the fastball, way over the top, and it's hard to pick up. You're sitting changeup, and all of a sudden here comes fastball. You're sitting fastball, and here comes the changeup. He has the ability to do it in any count."

Minor leagues
Shuster was included in the Braves' pool of 60 players eligible to participate in the 2020 regular season, which was shortened due to the COVID-19 pandemic, but did not play. 

He started the 2021 season at the Class A level with the Rome Braves. In September 2021, Shuster was promoted to the Class AA Mississippi Braves. Between the two teams, in 2021 he was 2-0 with a 4.44 ERA, as in 73 innings he struck out 90 batters (11.1 strikeouts per 9 innings). He was named a 2021 MiLB.com Organization All-Star.

Shuster was placed on the M-Braves 2022 Opening Day roster after spending some time at minor league spring training camp. On April 16, 2022, Shuster struck out eight consecutive Biloxi Shuckers' batters, which tied a Southern League record. Mid-season, he was a 2022 All-Star Futures Game selection. With Mississippi, he was 6-7 with one save and a 2.78 ERA (10th in the league) in 17 games (16 starts) covering 90.2 innings, in which he gave up 65 hits and 22 walks, and had 106 strikeouts and an 0.960 WHIP (6th), with 4.82 strikeouts/walk (7th). He then pitched for the Class AAA Gwinnett Stripers in the International League, and was 1-3 with a 4.25 ERA in 10 games (9 starts) in which he pitched 48.2 innings. He participated in spring training prior to the 2023 regular season, competing alongside Dylan Dodd for the fifth spot in the Atlanta Braves starting rotation.

See also
 List of Jewish baseball players

References

External links

Wake Forest Demon Deacons bio

1998 births
Baseball players from Massachusetts
Sportspeople from New Bedford, Massachusetts
Living people
Tabor Academy (Massachusetts) alumni
Jewish American baseball players
Baseball pitchers
Orleans Firebirds players
Wake Forest Demon Deacons baseball players
21st-century American Jews